The Carajás Mine is the largest iron ore mine in the world. It is located in the municipality of Parauapebas, state of Pará in the Carajás Mountains of northern Brazil. The mine is operated as an open-pit mine, and is estimated to contain roughly 7.2 billion metric tonnes of iron ore, plus gold, manganese, bauxite, copper, and nickel.
 The mine is run by the Brazilian mining corporation Vale (formerly the Companhia Vale do Rio Doce), and was initially part-owned with US Steel from 1970 to 1977.

The mine is located in the mining concession area of the Carajás National Forest, which "contains known reserves of 18 billion tons with an average grade of 65.4% Fe."

The mine is largely powered by hydroelectric power from the Tucuruí Dam.

References

Iron mines in Brazil
Gold mines in Brazil
Mines in Brazil
Manganese mines
Copper mines in Brazil
Nickel mines